Luna-Glob (meaning Lunar sphere) is a Moon exploration programme by Roscosmos meant to progress toward the creation of a fully robotic lunar base. When completed, the programme will continue with crewed lunar missions, starting with a crewed orbiter spacecraft called Orel.

The programme is based on plans dating back to 1997. Due to the 1998 Russian financial crisis however, the programme's first mission, the Luna 25 lander, was put on hold, only to be revived a few years later. Initially scheduled for launch in 2012 by a Soyuz-2 rocket, the first mission has been delayed many times, first to 2014, then to 2015 and 2016 and 2018 and 2019. Russia's Roscosmos approved a model of the Luna 25 lander in 2017.

As of September 2022, Luna 25 is planned to be launched in 2023, Luna 26 in 2024, Luna 27 in 2025, Luna 28 in 2027–2028, Luna 29 in 2028, and Luna 30 and 31 by 2030 (see List of missions).

History

The Luna-Glob programme is a continuation of the Soviet Union Luna programme that sent at least 24 orbiters and landers between 1959 and 1976 to the Moon, of which fifteen were successful. The last mission was Luna 24, launched on 9 August 1976.

Initially, the first Luna-Glob mission was planned as orbiter with ground penetrating sensors. Four Japanese-built penetrators inherited from the Lunar-A were to be used, each 45 kg (100 lb), including 14 kg (31 lb) for the penetrator proper. Furthermore, seismic experiments were planned, including the use of four penetrators, which will slam into the lunar surface equipped to detect seismic signals. These experiments are expected to help clarify the origin of the Moon.  Two of the penetrators are planned to land near the Apollo 11 and Apollo 12 landing sites, taking advantage of seismic data gathered there from 1969 to 1974. The payload of the orbiter will total  and include astrophysics experiments, dust monitors, plasma sensors, including the LORD astronomy payload, designed to study ultra-high-energy cosmic rays.

Luna-Resurs (Luna 27) was initially planned as a joint orbiter-rover mission (the orbiter was to be the Indian Chandrayaan-2) that would have featured a 58 kg Russian rover and lander, as part of the cancelled International Lunar Network. This joint mission would have landed in the Moon's south pole, examine a crater and operate for up to one year. Because the loss of the Fobos-Grunt in 2011 which was planned as a test for the landing system, Russia cited its inability to provide the lander and rover within the proposed time. India then decided to develop the lunar mission independently.

List of missions 
Unlike their predecessors, the new Luna missions are targeted at the lunar poles. As of 2019, the next missions have been announced:

Gallery

Future lunar base

It was planned in 2008 that Luna-Glob, a "robotic proving ground", would be followed by a robotic base, known in Russian as Lunny Poligon - or Lunar Range, and this base would progress with the construction of a habitable lunar base that would have several components: solar power station, telecommunication station, technological station, scientific station, long-range research rover, landing and launch area, and a telecom orbiting satellite.

When the robotic phase is completed, the programme will continue with crewed lunar missions in the 2030s, starting with a crewed orbiter mission on a spacecraft called Orel. As of 2017, Russia is planning to begin building the lunar base in the 2030s.

See also
Lunar resources
Soviet crewed lunar programs

References

External links 
 Luna-Glob at Skyrocket
 Luna-Glob at RussianSpaceweb

Russian space probes
Missions to the Moon

Sample return missions
2020s in Russia
Proposed space probes
2020s in spaceflight